VSK may refer to:

VSK Bandy, Swedish bandy club
VSK Osterholz-Scharmbeck, German football club
Pécsi VSK (men's water polo)
VSK-94, sniper rifle
HIW VSK, carbine